Barnagar railway station is a railway station in Ujjain district of Madhya Pradesh. Its code is BNG. It serves Badnagar city. The station consists of two platforms. It lacks many facilities including water and sanitation. Passenger, Express and Superfast trains halt here.

In 2015, Ratlam–Indore metre-gauge line was converted into broad-gauge line, hence connecting Indore and Ratlam directly.

Major trains

The following trains halt at Badnagar in both directions:

 14801/14802 Jodhpur–Indore Express (via Chittaurgarh)
 11125/11126 Ratlam–Gwalior Intercity Express
 21125/21126 Ratlam–Bhind Express
 19337/19338 Indore–Delhi Sarai Rohilla Weekly Express
 19333/19334 Indore–Bikaner Mahamana Express

See also 
 Indore Junction
 Ujjain Junction

References 

Railway stations in Ujjain district
Ratlam railway division